Danilo Šibalić (born 18 March 1988) is a Serbian professional basketball player.

Career
Šibalić started his career with KK Beovuk 72. He later played for Vojvodina Srbijagas, UBC St. Pölten (Austria), Ergonom, Radnički KG 06 and Ovče Pole (Macedonia).

In the 2010–11 season, he played for Ulcinj, and for the next season he signed with  Napredak Kruševac.

The 2012–13 season he started with KK Servitium of the Bosnian League. After appearing in five games he left Servitium and moved to Smederevo for the rest of the season.

On 15 May 2013 he signed with LF Basket of the Swedish Basketligan for the 2013–14 season.

On 24 September 2014 he signed with ABA Strumica in Macedonia. In December 2015, he left Strumica and signed with Teodo Tivat for the rest of the season.

The 2015–16 season he started with Smederevo. In January 2016, he left Smederevo and signed with Igokea for the rest of the season. On 2 July 2016 he re-signed with Igokea for the 2016–17 season. On 20 June 2017 he signed a two-year contract extension with Igokea.

On 5 August 2018 Šibalić signed for US Aubenas Basket in France to play in the 3rd-tier league for one year.

References

External links
ABA League profile
FIBA profile
Profile at eurobasket.com

1988 births
Living people
ABA League players
Basketball players from Belgrade
Basketball League of Serbia players
KK Beovuk 72 players
KK Ergonom players
KK Napredak Kruševac players
KK Igokea players
KK Radnički KG 06 players
KK Smederevo players
KK Teodo Tivat players
KK Vojvodina Srbijagas players
KK Žitko Basket players
OKK Sloboda Tuzla players
Serbian expatriate basketball people in Austria
Serbian expatriate basketball people in Bosnia and Herzegovina
Serbian expatriate basketball people in France
Serbian expatriate basketball people in Montenegro
Serbian expatriate basketball people in Sweden
Serbian expatriate basketball people in North Macedonia
Serbian men's basketball players
Forwards (basketball)